is a Japanese voice actress.

Filmography

Anime

Film

Video Game

Voice Dubbing

References

 

1975 births
Living people
Japanese video game actresses
Japanese voice actresses
People from Suita
Voice actresses from Osaka Prefecture
20th-century Japanese actresses
21st-century Japanese actresses